Quanah Independent School District is a public school district based in Quanah, Texas (USA).

Located in Hardeman County, a small portion of the district extends into Cottle County.

In 2009, the school district was rated "academically acceptable" by the Texas Education Agency.

References

External links
 Quanah ISD

School districts in Hardeman County, Texas
School districts in Cottle County, Texas